The Coalition for Divorce Reform (CDR) was established in early 2011 in the United States by Chris Gersten as "a non-partisan group of divorce reform leaders, marriage educators, domestic violence experts, scholars, and concerned citizens dedicated to supporting efforts to reduce unnecessary divorce and promote healthy marriages."

About
From 2001-2005, Gersten served as Principal Deputy Assistant Secretary, Administration for Children and Families, Department of Health and Human Services. He is married to Linda Chavez, a former Reagan Administration official who was nominated by President George W. Bush to serve as Secretary of Labor.

In a May 2011 interview, Gersten said, "the breakdown of the traditional family is the social equivalent of the national debt as a crisis in America and the West."

CDR advocates state passage of Parental Divorce Reduction Acts to slow the rate of family breakdown.

"These advocates now hope to lower divorce rates through laws that slow the process — with some exceptions — and encourage couples who are waiting to use opportunities to improve communication and relationship skills and hopefully reconsider."

In a New York Post article, CDR Co-Chair Beverly Willett wrote, "Until our laws address the intrinsic imbalances in no-fault divorce, and restore fairness and due process, our divorce courts will continue to foster fury that’s merely fodder for the 'pros.'"

Parental Divorce Reduction Act

According to CDR, the Parental Divorce Reduction Act (PDRA) is a "new research-based proposal to reduce unnecessary divorce, avoid serious lifelong consequences
for children, and save taxpayers billions of dollars."

The legislation proposes covering all married couples with minor children, with the exception of:

 spouses who are victims of domestic violence
 spouses who have been abandoned for 18 months
 spouses married to felons sentenced to prison for five years or longer or convicted of sexual offenses against a spouse or children
 spouses married to alcoholics and drug addicts refusing treatment
 
For non-exempt couples with minor children seeking a divorce, CDR proposes state legislation mandating "an eight-month reconciliation and reflection period that begins after both parties complete a marriage education curriculum."

The Washington Times reported on the proposal's potential to save billions for American taxpayers: "A new single-parent family with children can cost the government $20,000 to $30,000 a year. That's $33 billion to $112 billion a year total in divorce-related social-service subsidies and lost revenue."
 
Colorado State Senator Kevin Lundberg was one of the first state legislators to support the Coalition's efforts, proposing a bill that "would require parents who have minor children and are considering divorce to first undergo educational instruction that tells them how this impacts their children ... We have made it just too easy to bail out of a marriage," Lundberg said. A similar bill had been introduced by State Senator David Schultheis in 2001.

Some members of the faith-community were quick to rally behind the proposal. In April 2011, the Texas Pastor Council called on members to "be prepared to contact your State Representatives in support of this critical legislation." The Council's statement highlighted " ... the social, economic and justice system benefits from reducing divorces with children are literally immeasurable – most importantly in stopping the bleeding of broken families."

Writing in Psychology Today, author Rachel Clark became an early proponent of CDR's efforts. "Many of you know that I divorced, reconciled with, and remarried my ex-husband," Clark wrote. "When I first read about the CDR, I practically fell to my knees with relief and overwhelming gratitude that someone was actually doing something about this that might actually make a difference in people's lives."

A 2011 Heritage Foundation report, "Rebuilding a Culture of Marriage," said that the PDRA was introduced by New Mexico State Senator Mark Boitano in 2011. It described the PDRA as:
The bill proposes that parents with minor children be required to complete a divorce reduction curriculum taught by a certified instructor and an eight-month period of “reconciliation and reflection” before filing a divorce petition. The bill provides for a number of exceptions to this policy to address situations of domestic violence, imprisonment, recalcitrant substance abuse, or abandonment that make completion of the curriculum infeasible. An online curriculum option would be offered where in-person instruction is unavailable. Recognizing budget realities, the couple would be responsible for the course fee, but the courts could waive the fee for indigent parties, and the state secretary of human services would receive the authority to use TANF funds to make grants to defray the cost.

Reaction from family lawyers

The Washington Times reported that not everyone was in favor of the group's efforts to legislate divorce reform:

"When couples come to divorce lawyers, they usually have been through therapy already. I don’t understand the necessity of putting a reconciliation component into divorce-related or parenting programs," said family law attorney Pamela J. Waggoner, chair of the family law section of the Minnesota State Bar Association. "Since 1995, she said, she has seen only 'two or three' couples halt the divorce process to think about reconciling."

Leadership

Chris Gersten and Beverly Willett serve as the Coalition's co-chairs.

CDR's also has an Advisory Board that includes many of the national leaders in the field of marriage and relationship education, lawyers, a State Representative, and the dean of a Louisiana Law School:

 Beverly Willett, Esq., Chair
 Seth Eisenberg, President/CEO, PAIRS Foundation
 Abigail Hirsch, Ph.D., CEO, Power of Two
 Peter Larson, Ph.D., co-developer, PREPARE/ENRICH
 Cindy Noe, Indiana State Representative
 Michele Weiner-Davis, MSW, Director, Divorce Busting Center
 Bill Coffin, Senior Consultant, Marriage Educator
 Patty Howell, Ed.M, A.G.C., President, Healthy Relationships California
 Mike McManus, President and Co-founder, Marriage Savers
 Sherod Miller, Ph.D., Co-Developer, Couples Communication
 Mary Ortwein, MS, Co-author, Mastering the Mysteries of Love
 John Crouch, Esq., Divorce Attorney; Co-Founder, Americans for Divorce Reform
 Janice Shaw Crouse, Ph.D., Director and Senior Fellow, The Beverly LaHaye Institute, Concerned Women for America
 Harville Hendrix, Author; Co-Founder, Imago Couples Therapy
 J. Michael Johnson, Esq., Founding Dean, Pressler School of Law, Louisiana College
 Nisa Muhammad, Founder, Black Marriage Day; President, Wedded Bliss Foundation
 Scott Stanley, Ph.D., Co-Founder, PREP

See also
Marriage in the United States
Divorce in the United States

References

External links
  Coalition for Divorce Reform

Divorce in the United States